Human rights in Armenia tend to be better than those in most former Soviet republics and have drawn closer to acceptable standards, especially economically. Still, there are several considerable problems.

Democracy and freedom rating 
Armenia is classified as "partly free" in a 2019 report (with data for 2018) by Freedom House, which gives it a score of 51 out of 100.

Armenia has made improvements in its Human Freedom Index score from the Cato Institute. According to the 2021 report, Armenia ranks 40th overall. It ranks 48th for personal freedom and 15th for economic freedom. This is a notable improvement from the 2017 score which featured Armenia ranked 54th overall, followed by 29th for economic freedom and 76th for personal freedom.

Economy and human rights 

Corruption remained a problem as of 2009, according to the U.S. Department of State.

Political freedom 
Since the ouster of Levon Ter-Petrossian as president in 1998, political freedom has seen some improvement. Ter-Petrossian's administration saw constitutional change that secured more power for the president than the parliament. He also banned nine political parties (including, notably the Armenian Revolutionary Federation). Ter-Petrossian's semi-autocratic style of governing and his gradualist approach to solving the Nagorno-Karabakh conflict led to his ousting and the succession of Robert Kocharyan as president. Kocharyan was succeeded in 2008 by Serzh Sargsyan.

Armenia's former ex-presidents Serzh Sargsyan and Robert Kocharyan have accused Prime Minister Nikol Pashinyan of pursuing a political vendetta against them. Such as after the transition of power, Armenia's ex-president Serzh Sargsyan, his close relatives (brother –  Alexander Sargysyan, another brother – Levon Sargsyan, his son Narek and daughter Ani), former cabinet members (Seyran Ohanyan, Sergo Karapetyan, Gevorg Harutyunyan, Armen Gevorkyan and others), former members of Parliament (Arsen Babayan, Grayr Tovmasyan, Manvel Grigoryan), former judge- Samvel Uzumyan were charged with corruption, illegal income and tax evasion charges, some journalists (Gagik Shamshyan, Satik Seyranyan, Mher Yegiazaryan etc.) and political activists (Narek Malyan, Konstantin Ter-Nakalyan,  Artur Danielyan,)  were detained, charged with the use of drug, illegal possession of gun, and released later. According to Associated Press, Sargsyan has rejected all accusations against him, his relatives and former members of cabinet as a politically motivated charges.

Another former president of Armenia, Robert Kocharyan was accused of tipping those presidential polls in Sarkisian's favour and faces charges of "overthrowing the constitutional order". Dozens of Kocharyan's supporters rallied in May 2019 outside the Yerevan city court, holding placards that read "Kocharyan is a political prisoner" and "Political vendetta." The 64-year-old Robert Kocharyan told AFP the case was brought against him because of new leadership that pushed out his successor in a popular uprising last year. "What is happening to me is nothing less than lawlessness," he told AFP from prison.

2008 Armenian presidential election protests 

A series of mass protests were held in Armenia in the wake of the Armenian presidential election of 19 February 2008. The Human Rights Watch documented nine cases of unknown persons threatening and violently attacking opposition activists, journalists, and observes as a response to electoral fraud claims. Mass protests against alleged electoral fraud were held in the capital city of Yerevan and organized by supporters of the unsuccessful presidential candidate and first President of Armenia, Levon Ter-Petrosyan.  The protests began on February 20, lasted for 10 days in Yerevan's Freedom Square, and involved tens of thousands of demonstrators during the day and hundreds camping out overnight. After nine days of peaceful protests at the Opera Square, the national police and military forces tried to disperse the protesters on 1 March. Statements made by demonstrators suggested that police used excessive force to clear our the tent encampment erected by protestors. According to personal accounts the police attacked unprovoked to which later on the protestors responded with throwing rocks. As a result, 10 people were killed. Despite the urges of the government to stop the demonstrations, the protests continued until March 1. On the morning of March 1, police and army units dispersed the 700–1,000 persons who remained overnight, beating them with truncheons and electric-shock devices. As of March 4, many protesters are still missing. Since March 1, Ter-Petrosyan was placed under de facto house arrest.

Police and law enforcement 

In 2018 all neighboring countries of Armenia are on the list of 30 nations with highest imprisonment rates, while rates in Armenia were lower. After the report was compiled government initiated and conducted a large-scale amnesty.

There have been reports of police brutality and arbitrary arrests carried out. Beatings and torture of detainees before trial is used to obtain confessions or information. Demonstrations against the government have been dispersed with force, and opposition leaders have been detained. As of 2006 Abuse is common in the army and is suspected as the cause of many suspicious deaths.

Incidents 
On May 12, 2007, Levon Gulyan, who was called to the police as a witness to a murder case, died in the Police Main Department of Criminal Investigations after allegedly being beaten to death and thrown out a window by Hovik Tamamyan, the First Deputy Chief of the Police Main Department of Criminal Investigations. Police say that Gulyan slipped and fell down the first floor while trying to escape police custody. A preliminary forensic medical examination by forensic specialists from Denmark and Germany states that Gulyan's death was the result of fatal injuries that included fractures of the skull, thorax, spine and ribs. According to ArmeniaNow, "murders committed inside the police are not disclosed." In a letter addressed to the Head of Police, the Executive Director of the International Helsinki Federation for Human Rights (IHF) cited suspicions on the police explanation of Gulyan's death and mentioned that torture and ill-treatment by the police remain serious problems in Armenia, as noted also by the European Committee for the Prevention of Torture in its 2004 report on Armenia.

A partial list compiled by ArmeniaNow names 11 others who suspiciously died while under police custody.

Freedom of expression and of the media

2000s and early 2010s 

While the media has a degree of independence, the freedom of press in Armenia is limited. Some independent channels, such as A1+, Noyan Tapan, and Russian NTV, have had their frequencies taken away by the government. Journalists covering a demonstration against President Robert Kocharyan were attacked when police intervened to detain the protestors.

In January 2011, the Committee to Protect Journalists – an international media watchdog – criticized the Armenian government for maintaining a tight grip on the country's broadcast media and accused them of routinely harassing local journalists challenging them. According to the CPJ report, new amendments to Armenian broadcasting law in 2010 positioned President Sarkisian "to maintain control over the country's docile television and radio stations, most of which were owned by pro-government politicians and businessmen." The report also claims that the Armenian police officers “routinely harassed, assaulted, and arrested journalists” in 2010. “Prosecutors regularly colluded in this practice by failing to investigate police officers, even filing charges on occasion against journalists who protested abuses, CPJ research showed.”

Television 

Other than the Gyumri-based GALA, virtually all Armenian TV stations, including the Yerevan-based national networks, are controlled by or loyal to the government. The only major private network that regularly aired criticism of the government was controversially forced off the air in 2002.

In 2010, the Armenian government passed a set of controversial amendments to Armenian law on broadcasting that enables government regulators to grant or revoke licenses without explanation, as well as impose programming restrictions that would confine some stations to narrow themes such as culture, education, and sports. The Committee to Protect Journalists suggested that these amendments are primarily aimed at keeping the independent TV station A1+ off the air. It also pointed out that GALA TV, another, functioning independent broadcaster based in Gyumri, will be taken off the air in 2015 because of the amendments. Both A1+ and GALA TV failed to win new licenses in supposedly competitive tenders administered by the National Commission on Television and Radio in late 2010.

2008 State of Emergency 
Following the 2008 Armenian presidential election protests, President Kocharian controversially declared a 20-day State of Emergency on March 1, and used it to ban all public gatherings and censor all media (both Internet and in print) to include only information sponsored by the state. Also, the authorities closed several opposition newspapers along with their websites, including A1+ and Haykakan Zhamanak. Furthermore, the government blocked access to the YouTube website which contained videos from the March 1 protest and late night clashes with police that showed special forces firing automatic weapons directly into the crowd. Also blocked was the radio transmission and website access to Armenian Liberty, a service of Radio Free Europe.

Attacks on journalists 
Frequent attacks on journalists of non-state sponsored media is a serious threat to Armenia's press freedom.

On April 30, 2009, Argishti Kiviryan, a coordinator of the ARMENIA Today news agency (a paper known for its opposition stance), was severely beaten on his way home from work in Yerevan. Three unknown individuals reportedly assailed and severely beat Kiviryan causing him serious head and face injuries. His condition was reported as "serious but stable" after he was taken to the Erebuni medical center. The Human Rights Defender of Armenia, Armen Harutyunyan, condemned the act and, noting that almost all cases of violence against the journalists taken part in the past have not been disclosed, called upon the police to investigate and disclose his assailants.

On November 17, 2008, Edik Baghdasaryan, Armenia's one of most prominent investigative journalist and editor of Hetq, was violently attacked and sustained a severe head injury for which he had to be hospitalized. The attack was likely connected to his reporting.

Freedom of movement 
In the past law enforcement authorities blocked public transport access from nearby towns to Yerevan whenever there is a large opposition rally in Yerevan. On March 1, 2011, public transport between Yerevan and nearby regions ground to a halt in a government effort to lower attendance at a major rally to be held by the opposition Armenian National Congress (HAK). Bus stations in small towns close to the capital—including Etchmiadzin, Artashat, and Masis—effectively stood idle in the morning and early afternoon, leaving scores of local commuters stranded. Police patrols were also deployed on major roads leading to Yerevan. Police reportedly say that this is part of a special police operation aimed at tracking down stolen cars, or that police are looking for weapons. Both law enforcement and government officials denied opposition claims that the authorities are thus trying to keep many Armenians from joining anti-government demonstrators in Yerevan.

Freedom of religion 

The Armenian Apostolic Church has a considerable monopoly in Armenia, possessing more rights than any other registered religion. Other religious minorities include Russian Orthodox Christians, Syriac Christians, Greek Orthodox Christians, Jews, Muslims, Yazidis, and Jehovah's Witnesses. By and large, Armenia's Muslim community (once composed of Azeris and Kurds) is virtually nonexistent due to population exchange between Armenia and Azerbaijan during the First Nagorno-Karabakh War.

LGBT rights in Armenia 

Homosexuality has been legal in Armenia since 2003. However, even though it has been decriminalized, the situation of local lesbian, gay, bisexual, and transgender (LGBT) citizens has not changed substantially.  Lesbian, gay, bisexual, and transgender (LGBT) rights in Armenia have yet to be claimed and acquired. Homosexuality remains a taboo topic in parts of Armenian society as the nation trails other European nations in promoting LGBT rights. There is, moreover, no legal protection for LGBT persons whose human rights are violated regularly. Many fear violence in their workplace or from their family, and therefore, do not openly express their sexuality nor file complaints of human rights violations or of criminal offences. Armenia was ranked 47th out of 49 European countries for LGBT rights in 2013, with only Russia and Azerbaijan being worse for their human rights in this regard.

Lilit Martirosyan is a transgender woman who addressed Armenia's Parliament for 3 minutes on 5 April 2019. She told parliament that the organization that she founded, Right Side NGO, had recorded 283 cases of transgender rights violations. Some lawmakers were immediately hostile, saying that Martirosian had "...disturbed a hearing agenda and disrespected parliament." Members of the public threatened and condemned Martirosian and all transgender people living in Armenia. Armenia's Ministry of Foreign Affairs spokesperson, Anna Naghdalyan, responded to a statement from the European Union mission in Yerevan and EU member state embassies that condemned the hate speech directed towards Martirosian, Right Side NGO, and the LGBTQ community: "Our international partners should demonstrate more respect and sensitivity towards the Armenian society and refrain from undue engagement in the public debate, even if they disagree with its tonality. We would like to remind that the principle of public morality is a part of international commitments on human rights and cannot be ignored."

Historical situation
The following chart shows Armenia’s ratings since 1991 in the Freedom in the World reports, published annually by Freedom House. A rating of 1 is "free"; 7, "not free".

See also 
 Armenia in the Council of Europe
 Human rights in Europe
 Human rights in Asia
 Internet censorship in Armenia
 LGBT rights in Armenia
 Open Society Foundations–Armenia
 Social issues in Armenia
 Social protection in Armenia

Notes
1.Note that the "Year" signifies the "Year covered". Therefore the information for the year marked 2008 is from the report published in 2009, and so on.
2.As of January 1.

References

External links
 Human Rights Watch: Armenia
 Human Rights in Armenia website
 Human Rights Defender of Armenia
 Censorship in Armenia - IFEX